Barry Collier may refer to:
 Barry Collier (basketball) (born 1954), athletic director at Butler University and former basketball coach
 Barry Collier (politician) (born 1949), member of the New South Wales Legislative Assembly for Miranda in 1999